The Fox Reality Awards is an awards show to honor achievements in reality television. It was broadcast by the Fox Reality Channel from 2006 to 2009 when the channel was replaced in 2010 by National Geographic Wild.

Awards list
NOTE: Winners in bold.

2006

Favorite Fight
Jonny Fairplay vs Victoria Fuller and Jonathan Baker from Fear Factor: Reality All-Stars
Howie Gordon vs Marcellas Reynolds from Big Brother: All-Stars
Janice Dickinson vs Omarosa Manigault-Stallworth from The Surreal Life
Danny Bonaduce vs Dr. Garry Corgiatt from Breaking Bonaduce
Brooke "Pumkin" Thompson vs Tiffany "New York" Pollard from Flavor of Love

Favorite Pottymouth
Adrianne Curry from My Fair Brady
Jeff Conaway from Celebrity Fit Club
Danny Bonaduce from Breaking Bonaduce
Janice Dickinson from The Surreal Life

Favorite Tears
Andrae Gonzalo from Project Runway
Storm Large from Rock Star: Supernova
The Godlewski Sisters from The Amazing Race: Family Edition
Moana Dixon from The Bachelor: Paris
Jonathan Antin from Blow Out
Adrianne Curry from My Fair Brady

Favorite Showmance
Cher Tenbush and Wes Wilson from Beauty and the Geek
Suzy and Matt Hoover from The Biggest Loser
Kristy Swanson and Lloyd Eisler from Skating With Celebrities
Mike Boogie Malin and Erika Landin from Big Brother: All-Stars
Mike "Boogie" Malin and Will Kirby from Big Brother: All-Stars

Favorite Winner
Aras Baskauskas from Survivor: Exile Island
B. J. Averell and Tyler MacNiven from The Amazing Race
Josh Blue from Last Comic Standing
Mike "Boogie" Malin from Big Brother: All-Stars

Favorite Hottie
Katharine McPhee from American Idol
Storm Large from Rock Star: Supernova
J. P. Calderon from Survivor: Cook Islands
Janelle Pierzina from Big Brother: All-Stars
Erika Landin from Big Brother: All-Stars

Favorite Villain
Tiffany "New York" Pollard from Flavor of Love
Santino Rice from Project Runway
Omarosa Manigault-Stallworth from The Surreal Life 5
Will Kirby from Big Brother: All-Stars

Favorite Judge
Miss J Alexander from America's Next Top Model
Mary Murphy from So You Think You Can Dance
Carrie Ann Inaba from Dancing with the Stars
Little Richard from Celebrity Duets
Simon Cowell from American Idol

Favorite Altered State
Danny Bonaduce from Breaking Bonaduce
Katie Doyle from Real World/Road Rules Challenge: Fresh Meat
Christopher Knight from My Fair Brady
Lisa D'Amato from America's Next Top Model

Favorite Competition Show
American Idol
The Amazing Race
Survivor: Exile Island
Project Runway
Flavor of Love
Big Brother: All-Stars

Favorite Non-Competition Show
My Fair Brady
Extreme Makeover: Home Edition
The Real World: Key West (Winner)
The Surreal Life
Laguna Beach

Favorite Reality Show
Dancing with the Stars
Survivor
American Idol
Extreme Makeover: Home Edition

Most Memorable Reality Performer
Mike "Boogie" Malin from Big Brother 2 and Big Brother: All-Stars
B. J. Averell and Tyler MacNiven from The Amazing Race
Omarosa Manigault-Stallworth from The Apprentice and The Surreal Life
Jonny Fairplay from Survivor
Janice Dickinson from America's Next Top Model, The Surreal Life, and The Janice Dickinson Modeling Agency
Evan Marriott from Joe Millionaire
Toni Ferrari from Love Cruise and Paradise Hotel
Will Kirby from Big Brother 2 and Big Brother: All-Stars
Beth Stolarczyk from The Real World and Real World/Road Rules Challenge
Flavor Flav from The Surreal Life, Strange Love, and Flavor of Love

2007

Favorite Fight
Kamal "Chance" Givens vs Lee "Mr. Boston" Marks from I Love New York
James Reid vs Andria "Dreamz" Herd from Survivor: Fiji
Sharon Osbourne vs Piers Morgan from America's Got Talent
Leilene "Smiley" Ondrade vs Brooke "Pumkin" Thompson from Flavor of Love Girls: Charm School
Evel Dick Donato vs Jen Johnson from Big Brother 8
Saaphyri Windsor vs Renee "H-Town" Austin from Flavor of Love 2

Favorite Pottymouth
Gordon Ramsay from Hell's Kitchen
Dustin Diamond from Celebrity Fit Club
Evel Dick Donato from Big Brother 8
Adrianne Curry from My Fair Brady: We're Getting Married

Favorite Tears
Jen Johnson from Big Brother 8
Aaron Song from Hell's Kitchen
Paula Abdul from Hey Paula
Amber Siyavus from Big Brother 8
Ashley Ferl from American Idol

Favorite Showmance
Eric Stein and Jessica Hughbanks from Big Brother 8 (Winner)
Nate Dern and Jenny Lee Berns from Beauty and the Geek
Jackie Warner and Rebecca Cardon from Work Out
CT Chris Tamburello and Diem Brown from Real World/Road Rules Challenge
Will Kirby and Mike "Boogie" Malin from Dr. 90210
Danielle Donato and Nick Starcevic from Big Brother 8

Favorite Winner
Tyler Denk and James Branaman from The Amazing Race
Rahman "Rock" Harper from Hell's Kitchen
Evel Dick Donato from Big Brother 8
Traci Bingham from The Surreal Life: Fame Games
Yul Kwon from Survivor: Cook Islands

Favorite Loser
Bonnie Muirhead from Hell's Kitchen
Ian Ziering from Dancing with the Stars
David and Mary Conley from The Amazing Race
Sanjaya Malakar from American Idol
Ron Jeremy from The Surreal Life: Fame Games
Yau-Man Chan from Survivor: Fiji

Favorite Hottie
Bridget Marquardt from The Girls Next Door
Jen Johnson from Big Brother 8
Brooke Hogan from Hogan Knows Best
J. P. Calderon from The Janice Dickinson Modeling Agency
Molly Shea and Holly Huddleston from Sunset Tan
Bob Harper from The Biggest Loser

Favorite Villain
Dustin Diamond from Celebrity Fit Club
Cecille Gahr from Beauty and the Geek
Johnny Venokur from Scott Baio Is 45...and Single
Evel Dick Donato from Big Brother 8
Renee Alway from America's Next Top Model
Larissa "Bootz" Aurora from Flavor of Love Girls: Charm School

Favorite Judge
Mary Murphy from So You Think You Can Dance
Ant from Celebrity Fit Club
Len Goodman from Dancing with the Stars
Phil Keoghan from The Amazing Race
Ryan Seacrest from American Idol
Donald Trump from The Apprentice
Carrie Ann Inaba from Dancing with the Stars

Favorite Altered State
Jason "Heat" Rosell from I Love New York
Ripsi Terzian from The Bad Girls Club
Frank Roessler from Reunited: The Real World Las Vegas
Brooke "Pumkin" Thompson from Flavor of Love Girls: Charm School

Baddest Bitch
Renee Alway from America's Next Top Model
Jillian Michaels from The Biggest Loser
Arissa Hill from Reunited: The Real World Las Vegas
Brooke "Pumkin" Thompson from Flavor of Love Girls: Charm School
Cecille Gahr from Beauty and the Geek

Favorite Moment of Pray
Jameka Cameron from Big Brother 8
Saaphyri Windsor from Flavor of Love Girls: Charm School
Duane "Dog" Chapman from Dog the Bounty Hunter
Amber Siyavus from Big Brother 8
Michelle Sister Patterson from I Love New York

Favorite Competition Show
Hell's Kitchen
Big Brother
I Love New York
The Biggest Loser
So You Think You Can Dance
Survivor

Favorite Non-Competition Show
The Real World
My Fair Brady: We're Getting Married
The Deadliest Catch
The Hills
Criss Angel Mindfreak
Scott Baio Is 45...and Single

Favorite Reality Show
Survivor
Dancing with the Stars
American Idol
America's Got Talent
Big Brother
Extreme Makeover: Home Edition

Most Memorable Reality Performer
Adrianne Curry and Christopher Knight from The Surreal Life & My Fair Brady
Sanjaya Malakar from American Idol
Tiffany "New York" Pollard from Flavor of Love, Flavor of Love 2 & I Love New York
Len Goodman from Dancing with the Stars
Evel Dick Donato from Big Brother 8
Ant from Celebrity Fit Club

2008

Favorite Pottymouth
Jeff Conaway from Celebrity Rehab
Heather Chadwell from Rock of Love 2
Daisy de la Hoya from Rock of Love 2
Snoop Dogg from Snoop Dogg's Fatherhood
Kathy Griffin from My Life on the D-List

Favorite Villain
Omarosa from Celebrity Apprentice
Dunbar Flinn from The Real World: Sydney
Greg Halstead from The Real World: Hollywood
Johnny Venokur from Scott Baio Is 45...and Single
Nicole Williams from The Mole

Favorite Altered State
Erin Moran from Celebrity Fit Club
Jessica Kinni from Rock of Love 2
Jennavecia Russo from The Bad Girls Club
Pretty Ricky from From G's to Gents
Bobby Brown from Gone Country

Favorite Throwdown
Bo Kunkle vs. Chad Tulik from A Shot at Love II with Tila Tequila
Lee "Mr. Boston" Marks vs. Joshua "White Boy" Gallander from I Love Money
Heather Chadwell vs. Daisy de la Hoya from Rock of Love 2
Ezra "Buddha" Masters vs. George "Tailor Made" Weisgerber from I Love New York 2
Greg Halstead, Will Gilbert, and Dave Malinosky from The Real World: Hollywood
Brandi Ryan vs. Vanessa Romanelli from A Shot at Love with Tila Tequila

Favorite Hottie
Antonio Sabato, Jr. from Celebrity Circus
The Olly Girls/Holly Huddleston/Molly Shea from Sunset Tan
Brody Jenner from The Hills
Audrina Patridge from The Hills
Karina Smirnoff from Dancing with the Stars
Cristian de la Fuente from Dancing with the Stars
Lisa Byrnes from America's Most Smartest Model
Susie Feldman from The Two Coreys

Favorite Awkward Moment
Flavor Flav/William Drayton, Baby Mama/Liz, and Tresha|Thing 2 from Flavor of Love 3
Jake Perry and Corey Feldman from The Two Coreys
Bret Michaels and Megan Hauserman from Rock of Love 2
Jason Mesnick and DeAnna Pappas from The Bachelorette

Favorite Duo
Tori Spelling and Dean McDermott from Tori & Dean: Home Sweet Hollywood
Jeff Lewis and Jenni Poulos from Flipping Out
The Olly Girls/Holly Huddleston/Molly Shea from Sunset Tan
Corey Feldman and Susie Feldman from The Two Coreys
Deanna Pappas and Jessie Csinscak from The Bachelorette
Travis Brorsen and Pressley form Greatest American Dog

Favorite Meltdown
Lee "Mr. Boston" Marks from I Love Money
James Zinkand from Big Brother 9
Melissa "Rocky" Brasselle from I Know My Kid's a Star
Adrianne Curry from My Fair Brady: Maybe Baby?
Mark and Jay Kruger from The Biggest Loser

Favorite Host
Ryan Seacrest from American Idol
Chris Harrison from The Bachelor/The Bachelorette
Jeff Probst from Survivor
Jerry Springer from America's Got Talent
Heidi Klum from Project Runway

Favorite Non-Competition Show
Dog the Bounty Hunter
The Real World
The Hills
The Deadliest Catch
Tori & Dean: Home Sweet Hollywood
Keeping up with the Kardashians

Favorite Competition Show
Survivor
The Amazing Race
Project Runway
Pussycat Dolls Present: Girlicious
Dancing with the Stars
America's Got Talent
So You Think You Can Dance

America's Favorite
American Idol

Favorite Performer of the Year
Corey Feldman from The Two Coreys
DeAnna Pappas from The Bachelorette
Holly Madison from The Girls Next Door
Carrie Ann Inaba from Dancing with the Stars/Dance War: Bruno vs. Carrie Ann
Captain Sig Hansen from The Deadliest Catch

2009

Fashionista Award
Kim Zolciak from The Real Housewives of Atlanta

Favorite Performer of the Year
Joan Rivers from The Celebrity Apprentice
Hammer from Hammertime
Kim Zolciak from The Real Housewives of Atlanta
Terrell Owens from The TO Show
Antonio Sabato Jr from My Antonio

OMG Moment
Danity Kane Breaks Up from Making the Band
Jason Dumps Melissa from The Bachelorette
Teresa Versus Danielle from The Real Housewives of New Jersey
Spencer fights with Frangela from I'm a Celebrity... Get Me Out Of Here!
Jon and Kate Break Up from Jon and Kate plus 8

Favorite Hottie
Audrina Patridge from The Hills
Ray J from For the Love of Ray J
Kim Kardashian from Keeping Up with the Kardashians
Antonio Sabato Jr from My Antonio
Gretchen Rossi from The Real Housewives of Orange County
Karina Smirnoff from Dancing With the Stars

Totally Robbed
Adam Lambert from American Idol
Tamara Johnson-George from Survivor: Tocantins
Jonathan Ward from Make Me a Supermodel
Tailor Made from I Love Money 2
Mark Long from Real World/Road Rules Challenge: The Duel 2
Gilles Marini from Dancing With The Stars

Favorite Villain
Spencer Pratt from I'm a Celebrity... Get Me Out Of Here!
Wes Hayden from The Bachelorette
Janice Dickenson from I'm a Celebrity... Get Me Out Of Here!
Chima Simone from Big Brother 11
Kim "Poprah" Kearney from I Want to Work for Diddy

Favorite Host or Judge
Tom Bergeron from Dancing With the Stars
Ryan Seacrest from American Idol
Phil Keoghan from The Amazing Race
Jeff Probst from Survivor
Nigel Lythgoe from So You Think You Can Dance
Miss J from America's Next Top Model
Mary Ann Murphy from So You Think You Can Dance

Favorite Duo
Tori Spelling and Dean McDermott from Tori and Dean: Home Sweet Hollywood
Joan Rivers and Melissa Rivers from The Celebrity Apprentice
Jeff Schroeder and Jordan Lloyd from Big Brother 11
Tammy and Victor Jih from The Amazing Race
Tameka "Tiny" Cottle and Antonia "Toya" Carter from Tiny and Toya
Farrah Sinclair and Ashley from Charm School

Favorite Docu-series
Kathy Griffin: My Life on the D-list
Gene Simmons Family Jewels
The Hills
The Deadliest Catch
Keeping Up with the Kardashians
The Real World
Celebrity Rehab with Dr. Drew

Favorite Competition Series
American Idol
Survivor
Top Chef
America's Got Talent
So You Think You Can Dance
Dancing With The Stars

Innovator Award
Paris Hilton

Legend Award
Jonathan Murray

References

Roger Catlin (October 11, 2008). "Bonaduced at the Reality Awards", TV Eye.
Andy Dehnart, ed. (October 13, 2008).  "Fox Reality Really awards: scripted, pointless", Reality Blurred.
Cristina Kinon (September 30, 2008). "Cheezy Sez, The Fox Reality Really Awards Edition", NY Daily News: I Love to Watch.

American television awards